Clive Newman (born 6 May 1949) is a former Australian rules footballer who played with Footscray in the Victorian Football League (VFL).

Notes

External links 

Clive Newman's playing statistics from The VFA Project

Living people
1949 births
Australian rules footballers from Victoria (Australia)
Western Bulldogs players
Werribee Football Club players